Raphael Haaser (born 17 September 1997) is an Austrian World Cup alpine ski racer. He specializes in the technical events of giant slalom and Super-G.

Career 
Haaser achieved his first World Cup podium in December 2021, finishing second in a super-G at Bormio. At the World Championships in 2023, he took the bronze medal in the combined, following in the footsteps of his older sister Ricarda, who won the bronze in the women's combined the day before.

World Cup results

Season standings

Race podiums
0 wins 
1 podium (1 SG); 6 top tens (5 SG, 1 GS)

World Championship results

Olympic results

References

External links

Austrian Ski Team – official site – Raphael Haaser – 

1997 births
Austrian male alpine skiers
Living people
Alpine skiers at the 2022 Winter Olympics
Olympic alpine skiers of Austria